Loke Pangma is a small village within Pangma in Khandbari Municipality Ward No. 4 of Sankhuwasabha District of eastern Nepal.

References

 Pangma

Populated places in Sankhuwasabha District